Vamazğon (also, Vamazqon, Vamazgon, and Vomadzogony) is a village in the Lerik Rayon of Azerbaijan.  The village forms part of the municipality of Davıdonu.

References 

Populated places in Lerik District